The 64th Air Division is an inactive United States Air Force organization. Its last assignment was with Air Defense Command, being stationed at Stewart Air Force Base, New York. It was inactivated on 1 July 1963.

History

World War II
The organization was established during the early days of World War II as an air defense command and control wing assigned to First Air Force at Mitchel Field, New York.

By February 1943, it was clear that no German aircraft were heading to attack the East Coast, and the organization was realigned to become a command and control organization for Twelfth Air Force, engaged in combat as part of the North African Campaign. "The wing moved to North Africa in February 1943 and supported combat operations with a warning and control system, and, occasionally, augmenting the operations section of the XII Air Support Command in the Tunisian campaign."

"During the Sicilian and Italian campaigns (1943–1944), it administered fighter and fighter-bomber support to ground forces in a wide range of operations that included cover patrols, battle-area patrols, invasion coverage, escort missions, dive bombing missions, and reconnaissance. In Italy, the 64th directed close air support operations against enemy objectives in advance of Allied troops. Its primary targets included enemy gun positions, road junctions, traffic concentrations, assembly areas, bridges, and targets of opportunity."

"In August 1944 during the invasion of southern France, wing personnel, applying techniques developed in the invasion of Sicily and Italy, controlled air operations while aboard ships patrolling the assault beaches. With the landing of troops, a beachhead control unit directed aircraft to hit enemy strong points, ammunition dumps, troop concentrations, road intersections, supply lines, and communications. As Allied forces advanced northward along the Rhone valley, the wing implemented a plan to give more rapid support to the ground troops. Forward control units, equipped with the latest in air ground communications, directed sector air ground support. During the operations in France and Germany (1944–1945), the 64th continued to coordinate the close air-ground support of its fighter aircraft."

After the end of hostilities in May 1945, the wing served in the occupation of Germany as part of the XII Tactical Air Command, United States Air Forces in Europe. In Occupied Germany the wing performed many occupation duties such as destroying captured enemy aircraft, repairing roads, bridges and processing Prisoners of War. It also commanded combat units which were inactivating and sending their aircraft to storage, disposal or return to the United States. It was inactivated in Germany on 5 June 1947.

Cold War

Reactivated as an Air Division under Northeast Air Command (NEAC) at Pepperrell Air Force Base, Newfoundland in December 1952. NEAC had taken over the former Newfoundland Base Command atmospheric forces and ground air and radar stations in Newfoundland, Northeastern Canada and Greenland upon the former command's inactivation. The 64th Air Division was NEAC's command and control echelon of command over these assets.

"Its mission was the administration, training and providing air defense combat ready forces within its designated geographic area of responsibility, exercising command jurisdiction over its assigned units, installations, and facilities. In addition, the division and its subordinate units under its control participated in numerous exercises. NEAC was inactivated in April 1957, and its air defense mission was reassigned to Air Defense Command (ADC).

The 64th continued its operations under ADC at Pepperrell including the operational control of the Distant Early Warning Line (DEW Line) and Air Forces Iceland. In January 1960, it activated the Goose Air Defense Sector (Manual) at Goose Air Force Base. On 26 May 1960, the division headquarters moved from Newfoundland to Stewart Air Force Base, New York, when part of its mission was taken over by the 26th Air Division (SAGE) in a realignment of forces.

At Stewart it assumed the mission of training and providing air defense combat ready forces for the aerospace defense of a 6,000,000 square miles (16,000,000 km2) region of North America, including New Jersey, New York, New England north of Massachusetts, Eastern Canada, and atmospheric forces in Greenland.

The Division was inactivated in July 1963 with the phasedown of ADC at Stewart, its mission being taken over by First Air Force.

Lineage
 Established as the 3d Air Defense Wing on 12 December 1942
 Activated on 12 December 1942
 Redesignated 64th Fighter Wing on 24 July 1943
 Inactivated on 5 June 1947
 Redesignated 64th Air Division (Defense) on 17 March 1952
 Activated on 8 April 1952
 Inactivated on 20 December 1952
 Organized on 20 December 1952
 Discontinued, and inactivated, on 1 July 1963

Assignments
 I Fighter Command, 12 December 1942-c. 7 February 1943
 Army Service Forces, Port of Embarkation, c. 7 February 1943
 XII Fighter Command, 22 February 1943
 XII Air Support Command (later XII Tactical Air Command), 9 March 1943 – 5 June 1947 (attached to First Tactical Air Force (Provisional), 27 November 1944 – May 1945)
 Northeast Air Command, 8 April 1952
 Air Defense Command, 1 April 1957 – 1 July 1963

Stations

 Mitchel Field, New York, 12 December 1942 – 23 January 1943
 Oran Es Sénia Airport, Algeria, 22 February 1943
 Thelepte Airfield, Tunisia, 1 March 1943
 Sbeitla, Tunisia, 18 March 1943
 Le Sers Airfield, Tunisia, 12 April 1943
 Korba Airfield, Tunisia, 18 May 1943
 Ponte Olivo Airfield, Sicily, 12 July 1943
 Milazzo Airfield, Sicily, 1 September 1943
 Frattamaggiore, Italy, 7 October 1943
 San Felice Circeo, Italy, 1 June 1944
 Rocca di Papa, Italy, 7 June 1944
 Orbetello, Italy 19 June 1944

 Santa Maria Capua Vetere, Italy 19 July 1944
 St Tropez, France, 15 August 1944
 Dôle-Tavaux Airport (Y-7), France 19 September 1944
 Ludres, France, 3 November 1944
 Toul/Ochey Airfield (A-96), France, 15 January 1945
 Edenkoben, Germany, 1 April 1945
 Schwäbisch Hall, Germany, 29 April 1945
 AAF Station Darmstadt/Griesheim, Germany, 7 July 1945
 AAF Station Bad Kissingen, Germany, 1 December 1945 – 5 June 1947
 Pepperrell Air Force Base, Newfoundland, 20 December 1952
 Stewart Air Force Base, New York, 1 July 1960 – 1 July 1963

Components

World War II

Groups

 27th Fighter Bomber Group (later 27 Fighter Group: c. 28 May 1943 – c. 22 October 1945; c. 13 August 1946 – 5 June 1947
 31st Fighter Group: 1 September 1943 – 31 March 1944
 33d Fighter Group: c. 9 March 1943 – 14 February 1944
 36th Fighter Group: 15 November 1945 – 15 February 1946
 50th Fighter Group: c. 29 September 1944 – 22 June 1945
 52d Fighter Group: 9 November 1946 – 5 June 1947
 69th Tactical Reconnaissance Group: c. 22 March – 30 June 1945
 79th Fighter Group: 18 January – 29 September 1944
 86th Fighter-Bomber Group (later 86th Fighter Group): c. 31 July – c. 31 December 1943; 10 March 1945 – c. 15 February 1946; 20 August 1946 – 5 June 1947

 324th Fighter Group: 22 August 1943 – c. 5 March 1944; 30 April – 14 August 1945
 354th Fighter Group: 4 July 1945 – c. 15 February 1946
 355th Fighter Group: c. 15 April – 1 August 1946
 358th Fighter Group: c. 30 May – 18 July 1945
 363d Reconnaissance Group: 18 May – 20 November 1945
 366th Fighter Group: 4 July 1945 – 20 August 1946
 370th Fighter Group: 27 June – 17 September 1945
 404th Fighter Group: 23 June – 2 August 1945
 406th Fighter Group: 5 August 1945 – 20 August 1946

Squadrons
 14th Liaison Squadron: 10 July 1946 – 1 May 1947
 47th Liaison Squadron: 4 March 1946 – 1 May 1947
 111th Reconnaissance Squadron: attached June – September 1943
 155th Photographic Reconnaissance Squadron: 1 August – 24 November 1945
 415th Night Fighter Squadron: Attached c. 3 September – 5 December 1943, assigned 5 December 1943 – 15 February 1946
 416th Night Fighter Squadron: 15 August – 9 November 1946
 417th Night Fighter Squadron: 24 March – 17 May 1945; 26 June 1945 – 9 November 1946

Cold War

Force
 Air Forces Iceland
 Keflavik Airport, Iceland, 1 July 1962 – 1 July 1963

Sector
 Goose Air Defense Sector
 Goose Air Force Base, Newfoundland, 1 April 1960 – 1 July 1963

Wings
 4601st Support Wing, 1 October 1960 – 1 July 1963
 Paramus, New Jersey
 4602d Support Wing, 1 January 1961 – 1 July 1963
 Ottawa, Ontario, Canada
 4683d Air Defense Wing, 1 July 1960 – 1 July 1963
 Thule Air Base, Greenland
 4737th Air Base Wing (see 6604th Air Base Group)
 6604th Air Base Wing (see 6604th Air Base Group)
 6605th Air Base Wing (see 6602d Air Base Group)
 6606th Air Base Wing (see 6603d Air Base Group)
 6607th Air Base Wing (see 6612th Air Base Group)

Groups

 4684th Air Base Group, 1 July 1960 – 1 July 1963
 Sondrestrom Air Base, Greenland
 4737th Air Base Group, Newfoundland, 1 May 1958 – 1 September 1960
 Pepperrell Air Force Base, Newfoundland
 4731st Air Defense Group, 1 April 1957 – 1 July 1960
 Ernest Harmon Air Force Base, Newfoundland
 4732d Air Defense Group, 1 April 1957 – 1 July 1960
 Goose Air Force Base, Labrador
 4733d Air Defense Group, 1 April 1957 – 1 May 1958
 Frobisher Bay Air Force Base, Northwest Territories
 4734th Air Defense Group, 1 April 1957 – 1 May 1958
 Thule Air Base, Greenland, 1 April 1957 – 1 May 1958

 6602d Air Base Group (later 6605th Air Base Wing), 8 April 1952 – 1 April 1957
 Ernest Harmon Air Force Base, Newfoundland
 6603d Air Base Group (later 6606th Air Base Wing), 8 April 1952 – 1 April 1957
 Goose Air Force Base, Labrador
 6604th Air Base Group (later 6604th Air Base Wing, 4737th Air Base Wing), 8 April 1952 – 1 May 1958
 6611th Air Base Group, 8 April 1952 – 1 April 1957
 Narsarsuaq Air Base, Greenland
 6612th Air Base Group (later 6607th Air Base Wing), 8 April 1952 – 1 April 1957
 6621st Air Base Group, 8 April 1952 – 1 April 1957
 Sondrestrom Air Base, Greenland
 6614th Air Transport Group, 8 April 1952 – 1 April 1957
 Pepperrell Air Force Base, Newfoundland, 8 April 1952

Squadrons

 59th Fighter-Interceptor Squadron
 Goose Air Force Base, Labrador, 28 October 1952 – 31 December 1966
 61st Fighter-Interceptor Squadron
 Ernest Harmon Air Force Base, Newfoundland, 6 August 1953 – 17 October 1957
 74th Fighter-Interceptor Squadron
 Thule Air Base, Greenland, 20 August 1954 – 25 June 1958
 318th Fighter-Interceptor Squadron
 Thule Air Base, Greenland, 1 July 1953 – 5 August 1954
 327th Fighter-Interceptor Squadron
 Thule Air Base, Greenland, 3 July 1958 – 25 March 1960
 105th Aircraft Control and Warning Squadron (Fed ANG) (NEAC)
 Stephenville Air Station, Newfoundland, 8 April 1952 – 1 January 1953
 639th Aircraft Control and Warning Squadron
 Lowther AS, Ontario, 15 November 1958 – 1 April 1959

 640th Aircraft Control and Warning Squadron, 1 January 1953 – 6 Jun 60
 Stephenville Air Station, Newfoundland, 8 April 1952
 642d Aircraft Control and Warning Squadron
 Red Cliff Air Station, Newfoundland, 1 January 1953 – 1 October 1961
 920th Aircraft Control and Warning Squadron (NEAC)
 Resolution Island Air Station, Northwest Territory, 19 January 1952 – 1 April 1957
 921st Aircraft Control and Warning Squadron (NEAC)
 Saint Anthony Air Station, Labrador, 1 October 1953 – 1 April 1957
 923d Aircraft Control and Warning Squadron (NEAC)
 Hopedale Air Station, Labrador, 1 October 1953 – 1 April 1957
 924th Aircraft Control and Warning Squadron (NEAC)
 Saglek Air Station, Labrador, 1 October 1953 – 1 April 1957
 926th Aircraft Control and Warning Squadron (NEAC)
 Frobisher Bay Air Base, Northwest Territory, 1 October 1953 – 1 April 1957
 931st Aircraft Control and Warning Squadron
 Thule Air Station, Greenland, 1 May 1958 – 1 July 1960

See also

 List of United States Air Force air divisions
 Aerospace Defense Command Fighter Squadrons
 List of USAF Aerospace Defense Command General Surveillance Radar Stations

References

Notes
 Explanatory notes

 Citations

Bibliography

  
 .
 

064
Aerospace Defense Command units